Klaudia Kovács (born 17 November 1990 in Kiskunfélegyháza) is a Hungarian football goalkeeper currently playing in the Hungarian First Division for Astra Hungary FC. She is a member of the Hungarian national team.

References

1990 births
Living people
Hungarian women's footballers
Hungary women's international footballers
Astra Hungary FC players
People from Kiskunfélegyháza
Women's association football goalkeepers
Sportspeople from Bács-Kiskun County
21st-century Hungarian women